Freya Allan (born 6 September 2001) is an English actress. She is best known for her role as Princess Cirilla of Cintra in the Netflix series The Witcher. She also appears as young Sam in the 2021 film Gunpowder Milkshake and as the younger version of The Widow in the AMC series Into the Badlands.

Early life and education
Allan continued her artistic education at the National Film and Television School in Beaconsfield, Buckinghamshire, where, as part of her acting studies, she starred in two short films, Bluebird and The Christmas Tree. Allan went on to study at the Arts University Bournemouth, where she performed the part of Linda in the short film Captain Fierce.

Career
Allan played a minor role in the first episode of the 2019 BBC drama The War of the Worlds. The same year she appeared on the front cover of Schön! magazine, whilst they were celebrating their 10th anniversary.

Allan stars alongside Henry Cavill and Anya Chalotra as Ciri in the Netflix original series The Witcher.  This is a fantasy drama adapted by Lauren Schmidt Hissrich from The Witcher book series by Polish writer Andrzej Sapkowski. Allan was originally cast for a small role in the first episode but was later recast as Ciri, a main role. Allan lived in Budapest, Hungary for eight months, while the first season of the series was filmed. Allan starred in the second season of The Witcher, which was produced in London in early 2020 and released in 2021 on Netflix. Allan was nominated for Best Performance by a Younger Actor on a Television Series for the 2021 Saturn Awards. Allan's character Ciri appears together alongside Henry Cavill's Geralt of Rivia in season 2, training to become a fighter.

In 2021, Allan was cast in the lead role of the upcoming horror film Baghead, alongside Ruby Barker.  The film will be directed by Alberto Corredor.

Filmography

Film

Television

Awards and nominations

References

External links
 
 

2001 births
Living people
21st-century English actresses
Actresses from Oxfordshire
Alumni of the National Film and Television School
English film actresses
English television actresses
People educated at Headington School
actors from Oxford